was a Japanese film director and screenwriter.

Career 
Born in Hamamatsu, Sawai studied German at Tokyo University of Foreign Studies. Graduating in 1961, he joined the Toei Company as an assistant director and worked under such directors as Masahiro Makino and Noribumi Suzuki. He also collaborated on scripts such as those for the 'Truck Yarō' series. He made his debut as a director in 1981 with Nogiku no haka, a vehicle for the idol singer Seiko Matsuda.

He won the Directors Guild of Japan New Directors Award in 1985, and the Japan Academy Prize for Director of the Year in 1986.

Selected filmography 
 W's Tragedy (1984)
 Early Spring Story (1985)
 Maison Ikkoku (1986)
 Bloom in the Moonlight (1993)
 Genghis Khan: To the Ends of the Earth and Sea (2007)

Television credits 
asterisk = series director
 Daigekito Mad Police ‘80 (1980)
 G-Men ‘75 (1982)
 Getsuyo Wide Gekijo (1982)
 Space Sheriff Shaider (1984–1985)*
 Juukou B-Fighter (1995–1996)*
 Shogun no Onmitsu! Kage Juhachi (1996)
 Keijo! (1996)
 Non X (1996)
 Gamotei Jiken (1998)

Bibliography

References

External links 
 

1938 births
2021 deaths
Japan Academy Prize for Director of the Year winners
Japanese film directors
People from Hamamatsu
Japanese screenwriters